Secretary-General of the South Asian Association for Regional Cooperation is head of a SAARC Secretariat, which is headquartered in Kathmandu, Nepal. SAARC is an economic and geopolitical union between the eight South Asian member nations, Afghanistan, Bangladesh, Bhutan, India, Maldives, Nepal, Pakistan and Sri Lanka. Secretary-General is appointed for a three-year term by election by a council of Ministers from member states. Secretary-General is assisted by eight deputies, one from each nation, who also reside in Kathmandu. SAARC Secretariat was established in Kathmandu on 16 January 1987 by Bangladeshi diplomat Abul Ahsan, who was its first Secretary-General, and was inaugurated by King Birendra Bir Bikram Shah of Nepal. Since its creation, its member nations have contributed to a total of fourteenth General Secretaries. Sri Lanka's diplomat Esala Weerakoon is the current Secretary-General, having assumed charge on 1 March 2020.

Overview

Residence

SAARC Secretariat is based in Kathmandu, Nepal. It coordinates and monitors the implementation of activities, hosts meetings, and serves as a channel of communication between the Association and its member states as well as other regional organizations.

Secretary-General is assisted by eight Directors on deputation from the member states, and SAARC Secretariat includes officials from Afghanistan, Bangladesh, Bhutan, India, the Maldives, Nepal, Pakistan and Sri Lanka.

Regional Centres

SAARC Secretariat is supported by following regional centers established in member states to promote regional co-operation. These centers are managed by governing boards composed of representatives from all the member states, the SAARC Secretariat and the Ministry of Foreign Affairs of the Host Government. The Director of the Center acts as Member Secretary to the Governing Board which reports to the Programming Committee.

 SAARC Agricultural Centre (SAC), Dhaka, Bangladesh
 SAARC Meteorological Research Centre (SMRC), Dhaka, Bangladesh
 SAARC Tuberculosis and HIV/AIDS Centre (STAC), Kathmandu, Nepal
 SAARC Documentation Centre (SDC), New Delhi, India
 SAARC Human Resources Development Centre (SHRDC), Islamabad, Pakistan
 SAARC Coastal Zone Management Centre (SCZMC), Maldives
 SAARC Information Centre (SIC), Nepal
 SAARC Energy Centre (SEC), Pakistan
 SAARC Disaster Management Centre (SDMC), Gandhinagar, Gujarat, India
SAARC Development Fund(SDF), Bhutan
 SAARC Forestry Centre (SFC), Bhutan
 SAARC Cultural Centre (SCC), Sri Lanka

History

There have been 12 democratically elected holders of the office of Secretary-General of the South Asian Association for Regional Cooperation (SAARC). Bangladesh held the first summit in Dhaka, where the Bangladeshi diplomat, Abul Ahsan was elected its first Secretary-General. Since then, 11 more General Secretaries have been selected from each member nation, so far with the exception of Afghanistan.

Secretaries General of the SAARC

References

Secretaries General

South Asian Association for Regional Cooperation